The War Lord is a 1965 American drama historical film directed by Franklin J. Schaffner and starring Charlton Heston. The film, which concerns medieval warfare and culture in 11th-century Normandy, is an adaptation of the play The Lovers by Leslie Stevens. The film also features Richard Boone, Rosemary Forsyth, Guy Stockwell, Maurice Evans, Niall MacGinnis, Henry Wilcoxon and James Farentino, with Jon Alderson, Allen Jaffe, Sammy Ross, and Woodrow Parfrey.

Plot
Chrysagon de la Cruex (Heston) is a Norman knight charged with defending a Flemish village.  At the heart of the story is a doomed romance, which defies the social norms and sparks a growing confrontation with Chrysagon's brother, Draco (Stockwell).

Chrysagon encounters Bronwyn (Forsyth), his future love, as she is harassed by his own men.  Gradually he finds himself falling for the girl he has rescued.  Bronwyn's father, the village chief, Odins, later asks Chrysagon's permission for Bronwyn to marry Marc, to whom Bronwyn has been betrothed since childhood. Chrysagon approves, but soon regrets the decision.  He wants Bronwyn for himself.

He later learns of "Droit du seigneur", a right which permits the Lord of the Domain to sleep with any virgin woman on her wedding night.  But custom demands Bronwyn be given up by dawn.  The following day, Bronwyn is not returned and Marc demands justice.  What the village does not realize is that she has chosen to stay of her own free will. All of this takes place against the background of war against Frisian raiders who plague the Flemish coast.

Soundtrack
The film's score was composed by Jerome Moross.  The main musical theme was released as a guitar instrumental by The Shadows. A soundtrack album was released by Decca Records in 1965.

Reception
On Rotten Tomatoes the film has an approval rating of 67% based on reviews from 9 critics.

Critics largely lauded its "gritty" realistic portrayal of the times, both in physical aspects, such as armor and weapons, structures and scenes, but also in its portrayal of social circumstances and behaviors of Medieval lords and serfs.

Medieval historian Andrew E. Larsen praises the movie's realistic portrayal of the physical objects and social relationships of the time. But he asserts the film's presentation of paganism among the serfs is an extreme exaggeration, and that the key "custom" of "droit du seigneur" was mythical. He criticizes the film's romanticizing of "what is, essentially, rape," adding that—while such rapes have happened, at the time—they lacked any legal standing.

Cast
 Charlton Heston as Chrysagon
 Rosemary Forsyth as Bronwyn
 Richard Boone as Bors
 Guy Stockwell as Draco
 Maurice Evans as Priest
 James Farentino as Marc
 Henry Wilcoxon as Frisian Prince
 Niall MacGinnis as Odins

See also
 List of American films of 1965
 Middle Ages in film

References

External links
 
 
 
 

1965 films
Films set in the 11th century
Films set in the Middle Ages
American sword and sorcery films
American epic films
Films directed by Franklin J. Schaffner
Films scored by Hans J. Salter
Films scored by Jerome Moross
Films set in the Viking Age
American films based on plays
Universal Pictures films
1965 drama films
Films set in Belgium
Films set in Normandy
Films set in the Netherlands
American historical drama films
1960s English-language films
1960s American films